Denis Igorevich Voronov (born 2 June 1991) is a Russian former football defender.

Career
Voronov made his professional debut for FC Tom Tomsk on 2 October 2011 in the game against FC Rubin Kazan.

External links
  Player page on the official FC Tom Tomsk website
 

1991 births
Living people
Russian footballers
FC Tom Tomsk players
Russian Premier League players
FC Khimki players
Association football defenders
Sportspeople from Vladivostok